John D. Holum (born December 4, 1940) was Director of the U.S. Arms Control and Disarmament Agency and Under Secretary of State for Arms Control and International Security under Bill Clinton.

Biography
John D. Holum was born on December 4, 1940, in Highmore, South Dakota. He received a B.A. in mathematics and physics from Northern Michigan College and a J.D. from George Washington University School of Law in 1970.

From 1965 to 1979 he worked as legislative director for Senator George McGovern. When McGovern ran for president in 1972, Holum wrote his 56-page position paper on defense policy, which advocated cutting the defense budget from $87.3 billion in 1972 to $54.8 billion in 1975, a proposal Theodore White characterized as "an extraordinary flight of one man's imagination." From 1979 to 1981, he worked as a Policy Planning staffer in the U.S. Department of State. From 1981 to 1992, he worked in Washington, D.C. for O'Melveny & Myers. In 1992, he joined Bill Clinton's campaign, until he was appointed as Director of the U.S. Arms Control and Disarmament Agency in 1993. He served as Acting Under Secretary of State for Arms Control and International Security from 1997 until he was confirmed in 2000. He left his job in 2001, with George W. Bush's administration.

References

External links

Further reading
John D. Holum, Foreign Policy - Why Obama?, Huffington Post, February 25, 2008 

1940 births
Living people
Northern Michigan University alumni
George Washington University Law School alumni
South Dakota Democrats
United States Under Secretaries of State
People from Hyde County, South Dakota
Clinton administration personnel